Badhal is a 1996 Maldivian comedy drama film directed by Hamid Ali. Produced by Hussain Rasheed under Farivaa Films, the film stars Hamid Ali, Hussain Sobah, Niuma Mohamed and Waleedha Waleed in pivotal roles. The film was released on 9 October 1996.

Premise
Hussain (Hussain Sobah), a teenage boy with an immature attitude was restricted from attending his father's death anniversary held to honor his last wish of handing over the business to Hussain. Hussain's uncle, Wafir (Hamid Ali), humiliated by Hussain's presence in the party storm off at him when his plan of acquiring the business property backfires. A physiologist suggested Hussain to marry someone who is endearing and caring to obliterate the childhood trauma caused by Wafir's abuse. Wafir arranged Hussain's marriage with a wealthy businessman's only daughter, Shiuna (Niuma Mohamed) a charismatic and intelligent teenage girl. Regarding him as a mentally ill guy, Shiuna refutes the marriage proposal.

Cast 
 Hamid Ali as Wafir
 Hussain Sobah as Hussain and Hassan
 Niuma Mohamed as Shiuna
 Waleedha Waleed as Shaarudha
 Azleena as Naseema
 Chilhiya Moosa Manik as Moosa Manik
 Haajara Abdul Kareem
 Fathimath Shadhiya as Shadhiya
 Shameema Ahmed

Soundtrack

Accolades

References

1996 films
Maldivian comedy-drama films
1996 comedy-drama films
Dhivehi-language films